"Pavement Cracks" is a song by Annie Lennox, released as a promotional-only single from her album Bare in 2003.

Music video
A music video was made for the single; it remains unreleased but can be found on YouTube.

Track listing
"Pavement Cracks" (Mac Quayle Extended Mix) - 6:30
"Pavement Cracks" (Goldtrix Club Mix) - 6:26
"Pavement Cracks" (The Scumfrog Club Mix) - 8:21
"Pavement Cracks" (Gabriel & Dresden Club Mix) - 9:56
"Pavement Cracks" (The Scumfrog Knob Dub) - 6:45

Charts

Personnel

Mixed By - Heff Moraes
Producer - Stephen Lipson
Written-By - Annie Lennox

See also
 List of Billboard Hot Dance Music/Club Play number ones of 2003

References

2004 singles
2003 songs
Annie Lennox songs
Songs written by Annie Lennox
Song recordings produced by Stephen Lipson
J Records singles